Kälin or Kaelin is a surname, and may refer to:

 Alfred Kälin (born 1949), Swiss cross country skier
 Alois Kälin (born 1939), Swiss Nordic skier
 Carolyn Kaelin (1961–2015), American surgeon
 Charles S. Kaelin (1858-1929), American painter
 Christian Kälin, Swiss lawyer and businessman
 Karl Kälin (born 1943), Swiss psychologist
 Kato Kaelin (born 1959), American actor
 Urs Kälin (born 1966), Swiss alpine skier
 Walter Kälin (born 1951), Swiss humanitarian and lawyer

See also
 Kalin (disambiguation)